The Central District of Bijar County is a district (bakhsh) in Bijar County, Kurdistan Province, Iran. At the 2006 census, its population was 66,833, in 17,084 families.  The District has two cities: Bijar & Tup Aghaj. The District has five rural districts (dehestan): Howmeh Rural District, Khvor Khvoreh Rural District, Najafabad Rural District, Seylatan Rural District, and Siyah Mansur Rural District.

References 

Bijar County
Districts of Kurdistan Province